San Miguel is a location in the Bolívar Province, Ecuador. It is the seat of the San Miguel Canton.

References 
 www.inec.gov.ec
 www.ame.gov.ec

External links 
 Map of the Bolívar Province

Populated places in Bolívar Province (Ecuador)